L'amore nasce a Roma (i.e. "Love was born in Rome") is a 1958 Italian comedy film written and directed by Mario Amendola and starring Claudio Villa, Antonio Cifariello, Rossella Como and Valeria Moriconi.

Plot 
Lello, a painter, and Mario, a singer, move to Rome looking for fortune and success, their native country village far behind them. Expressing little in the way of artistic sophistication, their initial experiences are discouraging. They end up meeting Doretta and Silvia, two gracious flower stand sellers in Piazza di Spagna, and they immediately hit it off romantically. Doretta falls for Lello, and Silvia for Mario, and together they do what they can to help out their new love interests navigate the city's many challenges. One day it is revealed that Lello actually is a talented singer, so that the painter transforms into "the singer". Feeling slighted, Mario, out of sheer spite, takes Lello's brushes and proceeds to make his own paintings, which immediately attract interested buyers. With this apparent role reversal, the two women come to realize that their own interests have switched accordingly, with Doretta falling for Mario and Silvia realizing that Lello is the man of her dreams. Just like a fairy tale, everyone lives happily ever....

Cast 

 Antonio Cifariello as Mario 
 Claudio Villa as  Lello 
 Valeria Moriconi as  Silvia 
 Rossella Como as  Doretta 
  Nadia Marlowa as  Mariella 
 Carlo Campanini as  Sor Cesare
 Alberto Sorrentino as  Rubino 
 Mario Carotenuto as The Pool Player
  as  Doorkeeper's daughter
 Gino Buzzanca as  Mario's father
 Ciccio Barbi as  Lello's father
 Loris Gizzi as  Mr. Connolly 
  as  Mr. Leoni
 Ignazio Leone as  Mr. Carli

References

External links

Italian comedy films
1958 comedy films
Films directed by Mario Amendola
Films set in Rome
Films with screenplays by Mario Amendola
1950s Italian films
1950s Italian-language films